Jorge Carneiro (born 11 September 1956) is a Brazilian equestrian. He competed in two events at the 1984 Summer Olympics.

References

1956 births
Living people
Brazilian male equestrians
Olympic equestrians of Brazil
Equestrians at the 1984 Summer Olympics
Sportspeople from Rio de Janeiro (city)